The Federal Party was a short-lived political party in Puerto Rico.

The Federal Party supported greater self-rule for the island. The party was regarding as having among its members the former Spanish colonial elite consisting of large sugar plantation owners and hacendados who had enslaved the Black residents of the Island. 

In , the party was reconstituted as the Union of Puerto Rico, or Union Party.

References

Further reading
 José Trías Monge, Puerto Rico: The Trials of the Oldest Colony in the World (Yale University Press, 1997) 

Defunct political parties in Puerto Rico
Political parties established in 1899
1904 disestablishments
1899 establishments in Puerto Rico
1904 in Puerto Rico